Victor Hunter (born 1937) is a Northern Irish former footballer who played in the goalkeeping position. His clubs included Derry City FC and Coleraine FC, while he represented Northern Ireland both at 'B' and full international level. He won a 'B' cap in 1960 and later went on to win 2 full caps between 1961 and 1963. In 2017, Hunter was announced as Honorary Life Vice-President at Coleraine, at the club's 90th anniversary dinner.

His son, Barry, also represented Northern Ireland and is currently chief scout at Liverpool.

References

1937 births
Living people
People from Sion Mills
Association footballers from Northern Ireland
Northern Ireland international footballers
Derry City F.C. players
Coleraine F.C. players
Association football goalkeepers
Northern Ireland amateur international footballers